Joseph F. Cooper (March 30, 1854 – April 18, 1942) was an American jurist who served as an Associate Justice of the Supreme Court of the Philippines.

Profile

Hailing from Texas, he was appointed as one of the first seven judges of the Supreme Court of the Philippines under American civilian rule. During his three-year stint at the Court, he authored sixty-eight (68) decisions.

Notes

Associate Justices of the Supreme Court of the Philippines
American lawyers
American judges
1854 births
1942 deaths